The 1974 Florida Gators football team represented the University of Florida during the 1974 NCAA Division I football season. The season was Doug Dickey's fifth as the head coach of the Florida Gators football team.  Dickey's 1974 Florida Gators finished with an 8–4 overall record and a 3–3 record in the Southeastern Conference (SEC), tying for fourth among ten SEC teams.

Powered by a strong backfield that included Tony Green and Jimmy DuBose, Dickey employed the wishbone offense for the first season in the Gators' history.

Schedule

Primary source: 2015 Florida Gators Football Media Guide

Attendance figures: 1975 University of Florida Press Guide.

Roster

References

Florida
Florida Gators football seasons
Florida Gators football